The J.P. Runyan House is a historic house at 1514 South Schiller Street in Little Rock, Arkansas.  It is a -story wood-frame structure, with a dormered and flared hip roof and weatherboard siding.  The roof extends in front over a full-width porch, with Classical Revival columns supporting and matching pilasters at the corners.  The roof dormers have gable roofs, and have paired sash windows, with fish-scale cut wooden shingles in the gables and side walls.  It was built in 1901 for Joseph P. Runyan, a local doctor, and was later briefly home to Governor of Arkansas John Sebastian Little.

The house was listed on the National Register of Historic Places in 1992.

See also
National Register of Historic Places listings in Little Rock, Arkansas

References

Houses on the National Register of Historic Places in Arkansas
Neoclassical architecture in Arkansas
Houses completed in 1901
Houses in Little Rock, Arkansas
National Register of Historic Places in Little Rock, Arkansas
Historic district contributing properties in Arkansas